Sitting Bull at the Spirit Lake Massacre (also known as With Sitting Bull at the Spirit Lake Massacre) is a 1927 American silent Western film directed by Robert N. Bradbury, and starring Bryant Washburn as Donald, Chief Yowlachie as Sitting Bull, and Anne Schaefer as Mame Mulcain.

Cast

See also 
 Spirit Lake Massacre

External links 
 
 
 With Sitting Bull at the Spirit Lake Massacre at SilentEra

1927 films
1920s English-language films
Films directed by Robert N. Bradbury
1927 Western (genre) films
American black-and-white films
Silent American Western (genre) films
Cultural depictions of Sitting Bull
1920s American films